Galmurti (also Romanized as Galmūrtī) is a city in and capital of Dalgan County, Sistan and Baluchestan Province, Iran. At the 2006 census, its population was 2,999, in 628 families.

References

Populated places in Dalgan County

Cities in Sistan and Baluchestan Province